The Johns Hopkins Blue Jays are the 24 intercollegiate athletic teams that represent Johns Hopkins University, located in Baltimore, Maryland. They compete in the NCAA Division III, except for their lacrosse teams, which compete in Division I. They are primarily members of the Centennial Conference, while the men's and women's lacrosse teams compete in the Big Ten Conference. The team colors are Hopkins blue (PMS 284) and black, and the blue jay is their mascot. Homewood Field is the home stadium.

Hopkins celebrates Homecoming in the spring to coincide with the height of the lacrosse season. The Lacrosse Museum and National Hall of Fame, governed by US Lacrosse, was located on the Homewood campus, adjacent to Homewood Field, until 2016 when it moved to its new facilities in Sparks, Maryland.  Past Johns Hopkins lacrosse teams have represented the United States in international competition. At the 1932 Summer Olympics lacrosse demonstration event Hopkins played for the U.S. They have also gone to Melbourne, Australia to win the 1974 World Lacrosse Championship.

Origin of the name
Originally, the Johns Hopkins athletes were not called Blue Jays but the Black and Blue, a nickname derived from their athletic colors. Hopkins archivist James Stimpert has theorized that the Blue Jay name stemmed from Hopkins' student humor magazine, The Black and Blue Jay, first published in 1920. The "Black and Blue" came from the athletic colors and the "Jay" most likely stood for first initial in Johns Hopkins.

Varsity sports 
Baseball
M/W Basketball
M/W Cross Country
M/W Fencing
Field Hockey
Football
M/W Lacrosse
M/W Soccer
M/W Swimming
M/W Tennis
M/W Track and Field
Volleyball
Wrestling
Water Polo

Men's lacrosse

Women's lacrosse

Football

Men's Basketball
During the 2021–22 season, the Blue Jays' basketball team, spearheaded by head coach Josh Loeffler, recorded a 23–4 record, ranked first in the Centennial Conference or region.

Championships 
The school's most prominent sports team is its men's lacrosse team, which has won 44 national titles — nine NCAA Division I (2007, 2005, 1987, 1985, 1984, 1980, 1979, 1978, 1974), 29 United States Intercollegiate Lacrosse Association (USILA), and six Intercollegiate Lacrosse Association (ILA) titles. Hopkins' lacrosse rivals include Princeton University, Syracuse University, the University of Virginia, and a budding rivalry with Duke University due to intense recent competition, including one-goal victories over the Blue Devils in both the 2005 and 2007 NCAA Championships and in the NCAA semifinals in the 2008; its primary intrastate rivals are Loyola University Maryland, Towson University, the United States Naval Academy, and the University of Maryland. The rivalry with Maryland is the most prominent in college lacrosse and the two teams have met 105 times. On June 3, 2013, it was announced that Johns Hopkins would be joining the Big Ten Conference as a Sport Affiliate member in Men's Lacrosse starting in 2015.

The Blue Jays Men's soccer team has won eight Centennial Conference Regular Season titles along with another four ECAC titles previously to joining the Centennial Conference in 1993. The team has reached the NCAA tournament 12 times in the program's history. The team is currently on a streak of 16 winning seasons and has had over 20 All-American selections.

Hopkins also has an acclaimed fencing team, which has ranked in the top three of Division III teams in the past few years and in 2007 defeated the University of North Carolina, a Division I team, for the first time. The Swimming team also has ranked in the top two of Division III for the last 10 years. Hopkins also has a century-old rivalry with McDaniel College (formerly Western Maryland College), playing the Green Terrors 83 times in football since the first game in 1894.

Johns Hopkins' latest team to encounter postseason success is the school's baseball team.  Although Johns Hopkins baseball regularly wins the Centennial Conference regular season and tournament titles, 2008 was the first time since 1989 that the Blue Jays made it to the College World Series for Division III baseball, hosted in Appleton, Wisconsin. The Blue Jays finished runner-up to Trinity College, losing the championship game. In addition, Johns Hopkins Baseball made it to the D3 College World Series in 2010 (5th place finish) and 2019 (3rd place finish).

The Blue Jays were the first regular U.S. baseball team to play in the Soviet Union. In June 1988, they played three games in Moscow. They were also the first team to play with a Soviet baseball team on the American soil, on October 13, 1988, in Baltimore, Maryland, against the Mendeleev Moscow Institute of Chemistry and Technology varsity team.

The women's cross country team has experienced great success in recent years, finishing 7th at the NCAA championship in 2009 and 2010. The cross country and track & field teams have also had several All-American runners in the past few years. In 2012, the women's cross country team beat out top-ranked MIT to become the first women's program in Johns Hopkins history to win an NCAA championship. They also won the NCAA championship in 2013 and 2014, giving them 3 championships in just 8 appearances.

The Johns Hopkins women's volleyball team won their 1st Centennial Conference Title in 2011. The volleyball team has 4 NCAA All-Americans.

NCAA team championships
Johns Hopkins has won 22 NCAA national championships:

 Division I
 Men's Lacrosse (9): 1974, 1978, 1979, 1980, 1984, 1985, 1987, 2005, 2007
 Division III
Women's Cross Country (8): 2012, 2013, 2014, 2016, 2017, 2019, 2021, 2022
 Women's Soccer (1): 2022
 Men's Swimming (3): 1977, 1978, 1979
Volleyball (1): 2019

Centennial Conference Team championships
 Baseball (16): 1994, 1997, 1998, 2001, 2002, 2003, 2004, 2007, 2008, 2009, 2010, 2011, 2015, 2017, 2019, 2021
 Basketball (M) (6): 1999, 2007, 2014, 2018, 2020, 2022
 Basketball (W) (4): 1996, 1999, 2000, 2003
 Cross Country (M) (3): 2013, 2019, 2022
 Cross Country (W) (14): 2008, 2009, 2010, 2011, 2012, 2013, 2014, 2015, 2016, 2017, 2018, 2019, 2021, 2022
 Field Hockey (8): 1993, 1999, 2000, 2003, 2018, 2019, 2021, 2022
 Football (15): 2002, 2003, 2004, 2005, 2009, 2010, 2011, 2012, 2013, 2014, 2015, 2016, 2017, 2018, 2021
 Lacrosse (W) (4): 1994, 1995, 1997, 1998
 Soccer (M) (9): 1996, 1998, 2000, 2002, 2004, 2006, 2007, 2009, 2019
 Soccer (W) (15): 1996, 1997, 2002, 2005, 2006, 2007, 2008, 2009, 2010, 2011, 2013, 2015, 2016, 2019, 2022
 Volleyball (9): 2011, 2012, 2013, 2016, 2017, 2018, 2019, 2021, 2022

See also
List of NCAA schools with the most NCAA Division I championships
List of NCAA schools with the most Division I national championships
Big Ten Conference NCAA national team championships

Rivalries
McDaniel College-Hopkins rivalry  ''See: Maryland Railroad Lantern Game
Johns Hopkins–Maryland lacrosse rivalry Lacrosse
Johns Hopkins–Loyola lacrosse rivalry
Johns Hopkins–Navy football rivalry

References

External links